Calvin Brian Burnett (born 24 August 1954) is a former Guyanese cricketer who played for Guyana in West Indian domestic cricket during the late 1980s.

Burnett made his first-class debut for Guyana in January 1988, playing against Jamaica in the 1987–88 Red Stripe Cup. An off-spin bowler and middle-order batsman, he took only a single wicket in his first season, but scored three half-centuries (50 and 52 on debut and 63 against Barbados). At the beginning of the following season, in October 1988, Burnett represented Demerara in the final of the Guystac Trophy, which at the time also held first-class status. His final matches for Guyana came in February 1989, against Barbados in the 1988–89 Geddes Grant Shield (a limited-overs competition).

References

External links
 Player profile and statistics at CricketArchive
 Player profile and statistics at ESPNcricinfo

1954 births
Living people
Demerara cricketers
Guyana cricketers
Guyanese cricketers
People from East Berbice-Corentyne